Regine Mösenlechner (born 1 April 1961) is a retired German alpine skier.

Career
During her career she has achieved 8 results among the top 3 (1 victory) in the World Cup. She is married to Armin Bittner.

World Cup victories

References

External links
 
 

1961 births
Living people
German female alpine skiers
Alpine skiers at the 1980 Winter Olympics
Alpine skiers at the 1984 Winter Olympics
Alpine skiers at the 1988 Winter Olympics
Alpine skiers at the 1992 Winter Olympics
Olympic alpine skiers of West Germany
Olympic alpine skiers of Germany
People from Traunstein (district)
Sportspeople from Upper Bavaria
20th-century German women